The Ogdensburg Borough School District is a comprehensive community public school district that serves students in pre-kindergarten through eighth grade from Ogdensburg, in Sussex County, New Jersey, United States.

As of the 2018–19 school year, the district, comprising one school, had an enrollment of 236 students and 23.5 classroom teachers (on an FTE basis), for a student–teacher ratio of 10.0:1.

The district is classified by the New Jersey Department of Education as being in District Factor Group "FG", the fourth-highest of eight groupings. District Factor Groups organize districts statewide to allow comparison by common socioeconomic characteristics of the local districts. From lowest socioeconomic status to highest, the categories are A, B, CD, DE, FG, GH, I and J.

For ninth through twelfth grades, public school students attend Wallkill Valley Regional High School which also serves students from Franklin Borough, Hardyston Township and Hamburg Borough. As of the 2018–19 school year, the high school had an enrollment of 604 students and 56.0 classroom teachers (on an FTE basis), for a student–teacher ratio of 10.8:1.

Schools
Schools in the district (with 2018–19 enrollment data from the National Center for Education Statistics) are:
Elementary schools (PreK-8)
Ogdensburg Public School (235 students)
David Astor, Principal
Skye Patete, Assistant Principal

Administration
Core members of the district's administration are:
David Astor, Superintendent / Principal
Richard Rennie, Business Administrator / Board Secretary

Board of education
The district's board of education, with seven members, sets policy and oversees the fiscal and educational operation of the district through its administration. As a Type II school district, the board's trustees are elected directly by voters to serve three-year terms of office on a staggered basis, with either two or three seats up for election each year held (since 2012) as part of the November general election. The board appoints a superintendent to oversee the day-to-day operation of the district.

References

External links
Ogdensburg Borough School District

Data for Ogdensburg Borough School District, National Center for Education Statistics

Ogdensburg, New Jersey
New Jersey District Factor Group FG
School districts in Sussex County, New Jersey
Public K–8 schools in New Jersey